The Hopf theorem (named after Heinz Hopf) is a statement in differential topology, saying that the topological degree is the only homotopy invariant of continuous maps to spheres.

Formal statement
Let M be an n-dimensional compact connected oriented manifold and  the n-sphere and  be continuous. Then  if and only if f and g are homotopic.

References
 

Theorems in differential topology